Katlego Suzan Phala (born  1992) is a South African politician serving as a Member of the Limpopo Provincial Legislature for the Democratic Alliance. Phala was elected to the provincial legislature at the age of 22 in May 2014. She consequently became the youngest Member of the Provincial Legislature elected nationwide in that year's general election. Phala has since been re-elected in the May 2019 general election.

Early life and education
Phala was born in 1992 in Mankweng outside Polokwane. She was raised by her mother, Violet Phala. She matriculated from Mountain View High School in 2010. In 2014, Phala announced that she was studying for a degree in public relations management from the University of South Africa.

Political career
Phala joined the Democratic Alliance in June 2012 and established a party branch in Mankweng. For the 2014 general election, Phala was placed third on the party's list for the Limpopo Provincial Legislature. She was elected as the DA won three seats. Her election made history since she was only 22 years old at the time, making her the youngest member of the provincial legislature elected countrywide in that year's general election.

Phala was re-elected to a second term in May 2019. She took office on 22 May 2019.

References

External links

Living people
1992 births
Members of the Limpopo Provincial Legislature
Democratic Alliance (South Africa) politicians
21st-century South African politicians
21st-century South African women politicians
Women members of provincial legislatures of South Africa